Generalized context-free grammar (GCFG) is a grammar formalism that expands on context-free grammars by adding potentially non-context-free composition functions to rewrite rules. Head grammar (and its weak equivalents) is an instance of such a GCFG which is known to be especially adept at handling a wide variety of non-CF properties of natural language.

Description

A GCFG consists of two components: a set of composition functions that combine string tuples, and a set of rewrite rules. The composition functions all have the form , where  is either a single string tuple, or some use of a (potentially different) composition function which reduces to a string tuple.

The rewrite semantics of GCFGs is fairly straightforward. An occurrence of a non-terminal symbol is rewritten using rewrite rules as in a context-free grammar, eventually yielding just compositions (composition functions applied to string tuples or other compositions). The composition functions are then applied, successively reducing the tuples to a single tuple.

Example

A simple translation of a context-free grammar into a GCFG can be performed in the following fashion.

 

 

 

 

 

and the corresponding GCFG production is

Linear Context-free Rewriting Systems (LCFRSs)

Weir (1988) describes two properties of composition functions, linearity and regularity.

A grammar in which all composition functions are both linear and regular is called a Linear Context-free Rewriting System (LCFRS). LCFRS is a proper subclass of the GCFGs, i.e. it has strictly less computational power than the GCFGs as a whole.

On the other hand, LCFRSs are strictly more expressive than linear-indexed grammars and their weakly equivalent variant tree adjoining grammars (TAGs). Head grammar is another example of an LCFRS that is strictly less powerful than the class of LCFRSs as a whole. 

LCFRS are weakly equivalent to (set-local) multicomponent TAGs (MCTAGs) and also with multiple context-free grammar (MCFGs ). and minimalist grammars (MGs). The languages generated by LCFRS (and their weakly equivalents) can be parsed in polynomial time.

See also 
 Range concatenation grammar

References

Formal languages
Grammar frameworks